Making Auntie Welcome is a 1914 American silent comedy film featuring Oliver Hardy.

Plot

Cast
 Vincente DePascale as Jack
 Virginia Capen as Grace
 Oliver Hardy as Grocery Boy (as Babe Hardy)
 Raymond McKee as Police Chief
 Eva Bell as Auntie

See also
 Oliver Hardy filmography

External links

1914 films
1914 comedy films
1914 short films
Silent American comedy films
American silent short films
American black-and-white films
American comedy short films
1910s American films
1910s English-language films